Kalinowo may refer to the following places:
Kalinowo, Łomża County in Podlaskie Voivodeship (north-east Poland)
Kalinowo, Sejny County in Podlaskie Voivodeship (north-east Poland)
Kalinowo, Zambrów County in Podlaskie Voivodeship (north-east Poland)
Kalinowo, Ostrów Mazowiecka County in Masovian Voivodeship (east-central Poland)
Kalinowo, Pułtusk County in Masovian Voivodeship (east-central Poland)
Kalinowo, Wyszków County in Masovian Voivodeship (east-central Poland)
Kalinowo, Lubusz Voivodeship (west Poland)
Kalinowo, Elbląg County in Warmian-Masurian Voivodeship (north Poland)
Kalinowo, Ełk County in Warmian-Masurian Voivodeship (north Poland)
Kalinowo, Giżycko County in Warmian-Masurian Voivodeship (north Poland)